Warcraft is a franchise of video games, novels, and other media created by Blizzard Entertainment. The series is made up of five core games: Warcraft: Orcs & Humans, Warcraft II: Tides of Darkness, Warcraft III: Reign of Chaos, World of Warcraft, and Hearthstone. The first three of these core games are in the real-time strategy genre, where opposing players command virtual armies in battle against each other or a computer-controlled enemy. The fourth and best-selling title of the franchise is a massively multiplayer online role-playing game (MMORPG), where players control their character and interact with each other in a virtual world. Warcraft is one of the highest-grossing video game franchises of all time, having grossed $11.2 billion in lifetime revenue, as of 2018.

Expansion sets were released for Warcraft II (Beyond the Dark Portal), Warcraft III  (The Frozen Throne) and multiple expansions were released for World of Warcraft (The Burning Crusade, Wrath of the Lich King, Cataclysm, Mists of Pandaria, Warlords of Draenor, Legion, Battle for Azeroth and Shadowlands). World of Warcrafts ninth expansion, Dragonflight, released November 28, 2022.

At BlizzCon 2018 on November 2, 2018, Blizzard announced a remaster of Warcraft III entitled Warcraft III: Reforged featuring remodeled characters and graphics with a prospective release in 2019. The game was officially released on January 28, 2020.

All games in the series have been set in and around the world of Azeroth, a high fantasy setting. Initially, the start of the series focused on the human nations that make up the Eastern Kingdoms, and the Orcish Horde, which arrived in Azeroth via a dark portal, beginning the great wars. The Orcs came from another world, referred to as Draenor, the world that will be shattered into pieces by demonic magics during the events of Warcraft II, thereafter being known as Outland. Later on in the series the world of Azeroth was expanded, revealing the new continents of Kalimdor, Northrend, Pandaria, the Broken Isles, Kul Tiras, Zandalar, and the Dragon Isles, allowing the introduction of the Night Elves, Tauren, Pandaren, and other major races into the universe. The world of Azeroth also contains the traditional fantasy setting races of elves, dwarves, gnomes, orcs, and trolls.  Unusually for the genre, all of these races are available to be played, whereas trolls and full-blooded orcs are usually presented in fantasy fiction as being solely antagonists for protagonists of the more "human-friendly" races.

The series spawned several books and other media, covering a broad range of characters and timelines in the Warcraft universe. A collectible card game was published, which offered those who bought booster packs a chance to gain access codes to limited in-game content in World of Warcraft. Comics have been released alongside the books, further covering parts of the universe's storyline. A short-lived, online subscription only magazine was available but later ceased publication after five issues. A film adaptation, Warcraft, was released in 2016.

Video games

The first three games in the Warcraft series, including their expansion packs, were all released on both the PC and Macintosh. All of these games were of the real-time strategy genre. Each game proceeded to carry on the storyline of the previous games, and each introduced new features and content to improve gameplay. The name "Warcraft" was proposed by Blizzard developer Sam Didier. It was chosen because "it sounded super cool", according to Blizzard co-founder Allen Adham, without any particular meaning attached to it.

Warcraft II: Tides of Darkness was the first game in the series to feature play over the internet using Battle.net, although this was not included until a later release of the game. Warcraft II was also the first in the series to be re-released as a "Battle Chest", a bundled copy of the game containing both the original and expansion. Warcraft III: Reign of Chaos was the first game in the series to feature a Collector's Edition, which all subsequent games have released as well. Warcraft III and World of Warcraft also have both had "Battle Chests" released for them subsequent to their initial release. The "Battle.net" edition of Warcraft II was also the first to introduce the use of CD keys to the series, requiring each user online to have their own copy of the game in order to be able to connect.

In 1998, an adventure game in the series, Warcraft Adventures: Lord of the Clans, was announced as being canceled, having been previously delayed from a 1997 release.

In 2004, Blizzard Entertainment moved the series away from the real-time strategy genre and released World of Warcraft, a massively multiplayer online role-playing game (MMORPG). Requiring a subscription fee to be paid to play, it also introduced regular additional content to the series in the form of patches. World of Warcraft gained popularity worldwide, becoming the world's largest subscription-based MMORPG in 2008. The game reached a peak 12 million subscribers worldwide in October 2010. World of Warcraft has had eight expansions as of 2022 with a ninth on the way. During the production of StarCraft II: Wings of Liberty, Blizzard co-founder Frank Pearce stated that "If there's a team that's passionate about doing another Warcraft [real-time strategy], then that's definitely something we would consider. It's nothing that we're working on right now, we have development teams working on Cataclysm, StarCraft II: Wings of Liberty, Diablo III, and when those teams are all off the projects they're working on, they'll be intimately involved in the discussions about what's next".

In 2013, Blizzard announced a new free-to-play online digital collectible card game, originally titled Hearthstone: Heroes of Warcraft, with the beta being available in summer of 2013. In March 2014, Hearthstone was released. In addition to free-to-play basic gameplay Hearthstone contains fee-based features such as additional card packs.

On May 3, 2022, Blizzard announced a new Warcraft free-to-play mobile game called Warcraft Arclight Rumble.

In 2022, Blizzard and NetEase cancelled an unannounced World of Warcraft mobile spin-off game.

Other media

Tabletop games
 Warcraft: The Board Game – strategic board game from Fantasy Flight Games, based on Warcraft III
 Warcraft: The Roleplaying Game – role-playing game from Sword & Sorcery Studios
 World of Warcraft: The Board Game – board game based on World of Warcraft, also by Fantasy Flight Games
 World of Warcraft: The Adventure Game – board game based on World of Warcraft, also by Fantasy Flight Games
 World of Warcraft Miniatures Game – a miniature war game based on World of Warcraft, by Upper Deck Entertainment.

Collectible card games
 World of Warcraft Trading Card Game – 2006-2013

Novels
Warcraft: Of Blood and Honor (2000)
Warcraft: Day of the Dragon (2001)
Warcraft: Lord of the Clans (2001)
Warcraft: The Last Guardian (2002)
Warcraft: War of the Ancients (2007)
The Well of Eternity (2004)
The Demon Soul (2004)
The Sundering (2005)
World of Warcraft: Cycle of Hatred (2006)
Warcraft Archive (2006)
World of Warcraft: The Chronicles of War (2010)
World of Warcraft: Rise of the Horde (2006)
World of Warcraft: Tides of Darkness (2007)
World of Warcraft: Beyond the Dark Portal (2008)
World of Warcraft: Night of the Dragon (2008)
World of Warcraft: Arthas: Rise of the Lich King (2009)
World of Warcraft: Stormrage (2010)
World of Warcraft: The Shattering: Prelude to Cataclysm (2010)
World of Warcraft: Thrall: Twilight of the Aspects (2011)
World of Warcraft: Wolfheart (2012)
World of Warcraft: Jaina Proudmoore: Tides of War (2012)
World of Warcraft: Vol'jin: Shadows of the Horde (2013)
World of Warcraft: Dawn of the Aspects Parts I-V (2013)
World of Warcraft: Paragons (2014)
World of Warcraft: War Crimes (2014)
World of Warcraft: Destination: Pandaria (2014)
World of Warcraft: Chronicle Volume 1 (2016)
World of Warcraft: Illidan (2016)
Warcraft: Durotan - The Official Film Prequel (2016)
Warcraft: The Official Novelization (2016)
World of Warcraft: Traveler (2016)
World of Warcraft: Chronicle Volume 2 (2017)
World of Warcraft: Chronicle Volume 3 (2018)
World of Warcraft: Traveller: The Spiral Path (2018)
World of Warcraft: Before the Storm (2018)
World of Warcraft: Traveller: The Shining Blade (2019)
World of Warcraft: Shadows Rising (2020)
World of Warcraft: Sylvanas (2022)

 Comics
World of Warcraft (2007 – 2009), a series published by DC Comics imprint WildStorm."Walter Simonson: Into The World Of Warcraft ". Newsarama. November 25, 2007.
World of Warcraft: Ashbringer (2008 – 2009), a four-issue mini-series published by WildStorm.
World of Warcraft: Curse of the Worgen (October 9, 2012)
World of Warcraft: Pearl of Pandaria (September 25, 2012)
Warcraft Saga Issue 1
World of Warcraft: Dark Riders (May 7, 2013)
World of Warcraft: Bloodsworn (August 13, 2013)
World of Warcraft: Warlords of Draenor (2014) a three-issue series published by Blizzard
Warcraft: Bonds of Brotherhood (2016)
World of Warcraft: Legion (2016) a four-issue series published by Blizzard

Manga
Warcraft: The Sunwell Trilogy, a manhwa series published by Tokyopop.
Dragon Hunt (March 2005)
Shadows of Ice (March 2006)
Ghostlands (March 2007)
Warcraft: Legends (2008 – 2009), a five-part graphic novel series, which is a continuation from The Sunwell Trilogy.
World of Warcraft: Death Knight (December 1, 2009)
World of Warcraft: Mage (June 1, 2010)
World of Warcraft: Shaman (September 28, 2010)
World of Warcraft: Shadow Wing
The Dragons of Outland (June 2010)
Nexus Point (March 2011)

Magazine
In 2009, Blizzard announced that it would be releasing a magazine with Future US Ltd. This magazine would be purchasable by online subscription, and not for sale in newsagents or stores, making them collector's items. The magazine released quarterly, and each contained 148 pages. No advertisements were included in the magazine. In September 2011, Blizzard announced that the magazine was ceasing publication. Refunds, plush toys or in-game pets were given to subscribers depending on the outstanding length of subscription.

Film adaptation

In a May 9, 2006 press release, Blizzard Entertainment and Legendary Pictures announced that they would develop a live-action film set in the Warcraft universe. At BlizzCon 2008, according to Mike Morhaime, a script was being written.

In January 2013, Duncan Jones was announced to direct the adaptation, from a script by Charles Leavitt. The film was set to begin principal photography in early 2014 with a plot based on the novel Warcraft: The Last Guardian. On July 20, 2013, Legendary Pictures and Warner Bros. Entertainment unveiled a sizzle reel during their San Diego Comic Con 2013 panel, with Duncan Jones hopping on stage briefly to discuss the project. Production on the film started shooting on January 13, 2014. The first full-length trailer for the film was released on November 6, 2015. Warcraft premiered in Los Angeles on June 6, 2016, and was released by Universal Pictures in the United States on June 10, 2016. It received mostly negative reviews from critics, and grossed $433 million.

Heroes of the Storm

In 2015, Blizzard released Heroes of the Storm, a crossover multiplayer online battle arena video game in which players can control various characters from Blizzard's franchises as playable heroes, the majority of which come from the Warcraft universe. The game also features numerous mounts based on mounts or other creatures from World of Warcraft, as well as a battleground based on the PvP zone Alterac Pass. A number of Warcraft-themed skins have been introduced for Heroes of the Storm in the “Echoes of Alterac” event in June 2018. Various soundtracks from World of Warcraft, such as Obsidian Sanctum from Wrath of the Lich King, The Wandering Isle from Mists of Pandaria, and Stormwind theme, are present as background music in the game. Heroes of the Storm is inspired by Defense of the Ancients, a community-created mod based on Warcraft III.

Setting

Location
Most of the Warcraft series takes place on the planet of Azeroth. Other planets in the Warcraft universe include: Draenor (and its sundered remnants, known as Outland), Argus, K'aresh, Mardum (also known as the Shattered Abyss), Xoroth, Rancora, and Nathreza. There are also several metaphysical areas mentioned, including the Emerald Dream, the Elemental Planes, the Twisting Nether, the Great Dark Beyond, and the Shadowlands. Warcraft: Orcs & Humans, the first game in the series, takes place in Azeroth.

Azeroth

Azeroth has four known continents, named the Eastern Kingdoms, Kalimdor, Northrend, and recently rediscovered Pandaria. All continents are separated by the Great Sea. Three major archipelagos also reside in the Great Sea: the Broken Isles; Zandalar, the birthplace of the troll civilization; Kul Tiras, a maritime human nation; and the Dragon Isles, the birthplace of the dragons. In the center of the Great Sea is an enormous, everlasting vortex called the "Maelstrom" beneath which lies the aquatic city of Nazjatar, home of the amphibious Naga. Near the Maelstrom lies the volcanic Isle of Kezan, home of the goblins.

The Eastern Kingdoms are the primary setting of the first two games (and their expansions) and the first half of Warcraft III: Reign of Chaos. It is made up of 22 areas or zones. The kingdom of Stormwind lies at the south of the Eastern Kingdoms, south of the dwarven kingdom of Khaz Modan and north of the jungle known as Stranglethorn Vale. The capital city of Stormwind, Stormwind City, is nestled into the northwest of Elwynn Forest, a large forest at the center of the kingdom. The Dwarven capital in Khaz Modan, called Ironforge, is located in Dun Morogh.

The former human kingdom of Lordaeron, which successfully headed the human Alliance in Warcraft II: Tides of Darkness but later fell to the Scourge in Warcraft III: Reign of Chaos, is located north of the southern kingdoms. Underneath the ruined city of Lordaeron now lies the Undercity, capital of the Forsaken, a rebel band of the undead Scourge. The area is now known as Tirisfal Glades and is threatened by the Western Plaguelands held back at The Bulwark. Northeast of Lordaeron is the elven nation of Quel'Thalas and its capital city, Silvermoon, both of which were conquered by the Scourge in Warcraft III: Reign of Chaos.

The continent of Kalimdor was introduced in Warcraft III: Reign of Chaos and is made up of 18 zones. Whereas the Eastern Kingdoms can be described as the equivalent of medieval Europe, with traditional kingdoms and advanced cities, Kalimdor can be compared to the Americas at the time of the first arrivals of Europeans, full of wild lands. The geography and topography of Kalimdor are similar to North America and Africa, with massive, ancient forests and mountains covering the North and vast deserts and savannahs in the South. The Night Elven kingdom is located in the northwest region of Kalimdor, also including the island Teldrassil (actually a giant tree, similar in lore and spelling to Yggdrasil) off the northwest coast, which contains the city of Darnassus.

To the south, past the Ashenvale Forest, is a stretch of land known as The Barrens, situated between the grasslands of Mulgore to the west, and Durotar, the land settled by the Orcs, to the east.  Mulgore is home to the Tauren capital of Thunder Bluff, a large city of tepees and lodges built on top of a conglomerate of high plateaus which are only accessible by air travel and a great series of lifts built down to the ground. In the north of Durotar is the fortress-city of Orgrimmar, the capital of the Orcs.

The third continent, Northrend, is located in the northern polar region of Azeroth and is the primary stronghold of the malevolent Undead Scourge. Northrend is featured in Warcraft III: Reign of Chaos and its expansion set Warcraft III: The Frozen Throne, and is the main location featured in  World of Warcraft: Wrath of the Lich King, the second expansion pack to World of Warcraft.

In the expansion World of Warcraft: Cataclysm, Azeroth has been changed permanently in-game, even for players without the expansion set installed. The corrupted Black Dragon Aspect, Deathwing the Destroyer (formerly Neltharion, the Earth-Warder) has broken free from imprisonment in Deepholm, part of the Elemental Plane, and caused major changes and destruction in the land. In addition, many new parts of the continents of Azeroth that have previously been inaccessible have become key parts in the new world.

Lorewise, this is the second major change to the face of Azeroth, the first being the Sundering. The Sundering was caused as a result of the War of the Ancients where demons of the Burning Legion invaded the ancient Kalimdor. It caused a massive explosion that split the one continent into the four seen in-game and created the Maelstrom.

World of Warcraft: Mists of Pandaria was the fourth expansion released and it focuses on the mythical and long-forgotten lands of Pandaria, a continent far to the south that has until now been shrouded in magical mists. With both factions landing on Pandaria, adventurers rediscover the ancient Pandaren people, whose wisdom will help guide them to new destinies; the Pandaren Empire's ancient enemy, the Mantid; and their legendary oppressors, the enigmatic Mogu.

The storyline for Mists of Pandaria is split into multiple chapters. The story arc that introduces Pandaria—where players discover the continent and level up, helping to solve problems and figure out what happened for the past 10,000 years and why—was included entirely within the initial expansion release. Later chapters in the storyline brought the war between the Horde and the Alliance back into focus, including changing parts of Pandaria (via phasing) to show additional settlements, and eventually returning the players back to Kalimdor for a final showdown, dethroning Warchief Garrosh Hellscream.

World of Warcraft: Legion was the sixth expansion released and it focuses on the Broken Isles, a continent and group of islands located northeast of the Maelstrom in the middle of the Great Sea; one of the islands contains the Tomb of the Dark Titan, Sargeras. The Burning Legion has started an invasion of Azeroth and the player characters must find powerful artifacts to stop the invasion.

Having thwarted the Burning Legion's attempts to invade Azeroth, the players and other significant lore characters traveled to Argus, the homeworld of the Burning Legion, in order to end its threat. While successful, they couldn't stop Sargeras entirely. Before being banished and imprisoned, he thrust a magical sword into the surface of Azeroth, leaving the planet wounded and bleeding a magical substance called "Azerite".

World of Warcraft: Battle for Azeroth was the seventh expansion released and it focuses on the islands of Kul Tiras and Zandalar, two islands which are home to their respective kingdoms. This is the first expansion that introduces two new continents on initial release. During this expansion, the Horde and Alliance seek the aid of the kingdoms of Zandalar and Kul Tiras, respectively, for the reignited war between the factions. Throughout campaigns on both continents, adventurers learn the history of both kingdoms and uncover plots involving the Old Gods.

Events influenced by N'Zoth and his followers lead to the discovery of the continents of Nazjatar, the underwater kingdom of Azshara, and Mechagon, an island inhabited by the Mechagnomes. The final patch of Battle for Azeroth takes players back to the Vale of Eternal Blossoms and Uldum to cure them of the corruption of N'Zoth, and ultimately face the Old God himself in his empire of Ny'alotha.

The story of Battle for Azeroth is also the first time players are given choices that can have a significant impact on their own adventures. One significant choice is whether to join the orc Varrok Saurfang in his rebellion against the Horde Warchief Sylvanas Windrunner. Another choice that players are given is whether to become a servant of N'Zoth. Both choices lead to unique dialogue, cinematics, and quests, depending on the choices made.

The ninth expansion, World of Warcraft: Dragonflight, centers around the reappearance of the Dragon Isles, home of the Dragons and their many aspects, including the humanoid Dracthyr. The various Dragon groups and subspecies are referred to as "Dragonflights", and are all descendants of the original proto-dragons who chose to become empowered by the magic of a race of god-like beings called the Titans.

The plot of Dragonflight deals with the awakening of the Dracthyr after 20,000 years in response to the threat of Raszageth the Storm-Eater, a "Primalist" proto-dragon who seeks to separate the rest of her kind from the Dragonflights and retake Azeroth for themselves. The Dracthyr are divided into two groups, one that allies with the Alliance and one the Horde, to deal with this threat. Raszageth eventually falls to both groups, but not before she releases her three siblings: Fyrakk the Blazing, Vyranoth the Frozenheart, and Iridikron the Stoneheart.

Draenor (Outland)
Draenor, which is featured in Warcraft II: Beyond the Dark Portal, is the original homeland of the Orcs and past home of the Draenei.

Draenor was torn apart when the Orcish leader, Ner'Zhul (later the first Lich King) opened dozens of portals to other worlds in an attempt to escape the invading Alliance Armies from Azeroth.  The sheer number and combined power of the portals ripped Draenor into fragments and cast the remainder into the mysterious parallel dimension called the Twisting Nether, Home of the Demons. The remnants of the world are now known as Outland, and feature in the last mission of the human campaign of Warcraft II: Beyond the Dark Portal (though, without any actual terrain changes), Warcraft III: The Frozen Throne and more prominently in World of Warcraft: The Burning Crusade.

An intact Draenor is the main feature of the fifth World of Warcraft expansion, Warlords of Draenor, which takes place 35 years earlier in an alternate timeline.

Major races and factions
The following races have been sorted into their respective factions: 

The Alliance
The Alliance has been present in some form in all Warcraft games. In all three real-time strategy games, the Alliance are the protagonists of their campaign, and are one of the two main protagonist factions in World of Warcraft. They are also the primary antagonists of Warcraft and the orc campaigns in Warcraft II. The Alliance began in Warcraft II when the human kingdoms and demihumans strategically united to fend off the conquering Horde. Thus they are enemies to the Horde. The Alliance has evolved over the course of the franchise, losing allies and gaining new members, but the Alliance has endured over the years. They are united to uphold their common noble ideals and are bound together by a sense of brotherhood forged by all the battles they've endured together. The major races of the Alliance are the humans of Stormwind, the High Elves, the Night Elves of Teldrassil, and the Dwarves of Ironforge. Other races who have joined or allied with the Alliance include the Gnomes of Gnomergan, the Draenei of Outland, the Worgens of Gilneas (creatures that resemble hunched over werewolves), and the Tushui Pandaren. The Alliance is led by a military commander who coordinates the military actions of all the races in the Alliance. The title for this position depends on the rank of the individual (e.g., Anduin Lothar was a knight and his title was Supreme Allied Commander. Varian Wrynn is a king and his title is High King). This title may require an aspect of diplomacy or has strong political clout as the other leaders can choose not to commit their forces to the commander if they dislike the commander's leadership. Though how much forces and resources are contributed to the war effort is left to each individual leader's discretion, when the military commander issues a call to arms, all races of the Alliance are expected to contribute.

The Horde
In the first two Warcraft games, the Horde''' is made of the orcs under the command of the Burning Legion and are enemies of the human led Alliance. The orcs attempt in both games to conquer the human kingdoms. Eventually the Horde was defeated, most of its leaders killed, and the orcs placed in internment camps. 

The third Warcraft game, Reign of Chaos, details the orcs shaking off both the chains of the Alliance, and the corruption of the Burning Legion. The Horde expanded their ranks by forging alliances with the Blood Elves, the Forsaken, the Goblins, the Huojin Pandaren, the Tauren, and the Trolls.

Reception
In 1999, Next Generation listed Warcraft and Starcraft as number 32 on their "Top 50 Games of All Time", commenting that, "While Warcraft did not create the realtime strategy genre, it made it appealing to a broad audience. Warcraft II went on to refine the genre. Easy to play, nuanced in design, a pleasure to look at, and often a laugh riot, Warcraft II'' was nearly perfect."

References

Further reading

External links

 Official World of Warcraft community site (US)
 Official World of Warcraft community site (EU)
 Warcraft - Orcs and Humans (demo) 
 

 
Activision Blizzard franchises
Blizzard games
Real-time strategy video games by series
Video game franchises introduced in 1994
Video games adapted into comics
Video games adapted into films
Video games adapted into novels
Video games set on fictional planets